The 2011 Wealden District Council election took place on 5 May 2011 to elect members of Wealden District Council in East Sussex, England. The whole council was up for election and the Conservative Party stayed in overall control of the council.

Background
At the 2007 election the Conservatives retained control of Wealden council with 34 seats, compared to 12 for the Liberal Democrats, 7 independents and 2 Green party councillors. However at a by-election in September 2008 the Liberal Democrats gained a seat from the Conservatives in Alfriston, meaning that by 2011 there were 33 Conservatives and 13 Liberal Democrats, while the independents were split into 3 Independent Democrats and 4 Independents.

The Conservatives were the only party with candidates for all 55 seats being contested in 35 wards and they were guaranteed gains in Forest Row after the Green Party did not defend the seats they had won in 2007 and no other party stood in the ward. The Liberal Democrats only put up 24 candidates, down from 35 in 2007, with the party not defending 2 seats in Crowborough, where Liberal Democrats councillors Jane Clark and Martin Prestage stood down at the election. Meanwhile, Labour had 27 candidates, a substantial increase from only 3 in 2007.

Election result
The Conservatives increased their majority on the council after gaining 14 seats, to have 47 of the 55 councillors. This included winning all of the seats in Uckfield, where the party gained 4 seats from the Liberal Democrats. The Conservative leader of the council, Bob Standley, described the results as a "ringing endorsement" of the policies of the Conservative council. Overall turnout at the election was 49.5%, up from 38.51% in 2007.

The Liberal Democrats lost 10 seats to only have 3 of the 13 councillors the party had held before the election. Meanwhile, neither Labour, nor any other party, managed to win any seats, with a spokesperson for Labour saying that Wealden was now "virtually a one party state".

Independents won five seats, down two, with four of those five being taken by members of the Shing family in Polegate and Willingdon, and the final seat being won by a former mayor of Crowborough, Stephen Isted, in Crowborough Jarvis Brook. This led to the Conservatives being criticised by anti-racism groups over comments on the party website saying that the Liberal Democrats had seen "the humiliation of the 'Shing' dynasty becoming the official opposition".

4 Conservative candidates were unopposed at the election.

Ward results

By-elections between 2011 and 2015

Polegate North
A by-election was held in Polegate North on 2 August 2012 following the death of Liberal Democrat councillor Roy Martin. The seat was held for the Liberal Democrats by Don Broadbent with a majority of 227 votes over an independent candidate.

Heathfield North and Central
A by-election was held in Heathfield North and Central on 29 November 2012 after the death of Conservative councillor Peter Newnham. The seat was held for the Conservatives by Raymond Cade with a majority of 384 votes over the UK Independence Party.

Crowborough West
A by-election was held in Crowborough West on 22 January 2015 after the death of Conservative councillor Antony Quin. The seat was held for the Conservatives by Simon Staveley with a majority of 138 votes over the UK Independence Party.

References

2011 English local elections
2011
2010s in East Sussex